Betéitiva a town and municipality in the Valderrama Province, part of the Colombian department of Boyacá. The municipality, located on the Altiplano Cundiboyacense, borders in the north Belén, in the northeast Paz de Río, in the east Tasco, in the southeast Corrales and in the west with Busbanzá and Cerinza.

Etymology 
The name Betéitiva is derived from the Chibcha name of the cacique Betacín of the village and means "chief of the anchovy". According to Muisca myths, Betacín fell in love with the daughter of the iraca of Sugamuxi and after her dismissal he retreated in the area now known as Betéitiva.

History 
The area of Betéitiva before the Spanish conquest was inhabited by the Muisca, organized in their loose Muisca Confederation. Different rulers were reigning the central highlands of the Colombian Andes and Betéitiva was ruled by cacique Betacín.

Modern Betéitiva was founded on October 14, 1556 by Juan Salamanca.

Economy 
Potatoes and dairy farming are the most important economical activities of the municipality.

References 

Municipalities of Boyacá Department
Populated places established in 1556
1556 establishments in the Spanish Empire
Muisca Confederation